Pridvorica may refer to:

 Pridvorica, Blace, in the municipality of Blace, Serbia
 Pridvorica, Bojnik, in the municipality of Bojnik, Serbia
 Pridvorica, Gacko, in the municipality of Gacko, Republika Srpska, Bosnia and Herzegovina
 Pridvorica, Čačak, in the municipality of Čačak, Serbia
 Pridvorica, Kraljevo, in the municipality of Kraljevo, Serbia
 Pridvorica, Lajkovac, in the municipality of Lajkovac, Serbia
 Pridvorica, Šavnik, in the municipality of Šavnik, Montenegro